The Azusa Pacific Cougars are the athletic teams that represent Azusa Pacific University, located in Azusa, California, in intercollegiate sports as a member of the Division II level of the National Collegiate Athletic Association (NCAA), primarily competing in the Pacific West Conference (PacWest) for most of its sports since the 2012–13 academic year; while its women's swimming & diving team competes in the Pacific Collegiate Swim and Dive Conference (PCSC) and its women's water polo team competes in the Golden Coast Conference (GCC). The Cougars previously competed in the Golden State Athletic Conference (GSAC) of the National Association of Intercollegiate Athletics (NAIA) from 1986–87 to 2011–12. On July 11, 2011 Azusa Pacific began the three-year transition process to becoming a member of the NCAA. Azusa Pacific University decided to end its football program in December 2020 due to financial restructuring.

Azusa Pacific Athletics achieved eight consecutive wins of the Directors’ Cup from 2005 to 2012, with a total of 108 GSAC Championships and 36 NAIA National Championships.  Since joining NCAA Division II, the program has added 31 PacWest Conference Championships and four GNAC championships in football.

Varsity teams
Azusa Pacific competes in 16 intercollegiate varsity sports: Men's sports include baseball, basketball, cross country, soccer, tennis and track & field; while women's sports include acrobatics and tumbling, basketball, cross country, soccer, softball, swimming & diving, tennis, track & field, volleyball, water polo.

National championships

Team

References

External links